In medicine and statistics, a gold standard test is usually the diagnostic test or benchmark that is the best available under reasonable conditions. In other words, a gold standard is the most accurate test possible without restrictions.

The meanings may differ in the two fields, because in medicine with some conditions only an autopsy guarantees diagnostic certainty, thus the gold standard test would be the best one that keeps the patient alive instead of the autopsy.

In medicine

"Gold standard" can refer to the criteria by which scientific evidence is evaluated. For example, in resuscitation research, the "gold standard" test of a medication or procedure is whether or not it leads to an increase in the number of neurologically intact survivors that walk out of the hospital. Other types of medical research might regard a significant decrease in 30-day mortality as the gold standard.

The AMA Style Guide has preferred the phrase Criterion Standard instead of "gold standard." Other journals have also issued mandates in their instructions for contributors.  For instance, Archives of biological Medicine and Rehabilitation specifies this usage. When the criterion is a whole clinical testing procedure it is usually referred to as clinical case definition. 

In practice however, the uptake of this term by authors, as well as enforcement by editorial staff, is notably poor, at least for AMA journals. 

A hypothetical ideal "gold standard" test has a sensitivity of 100% with respect to the presence of the disease (it identifies all individuals with a well defined disease process; it does not have any false-negative results) and a specificity of 100% (it does not falsely identify someone with a condition that does not have the condition; it does not have any false-positive results).  In practice, there are sometimes no true gold standard tests.

As new diagnostic methods become available, the "gold standard" test may change over time.  For instance, for the diagnosis of aortic dissection, the gold standard test used to be the aortogram, which had a sensitivity as low as 83% and a specificity as low as 87%.  Since the advancements of magnetic resonance imaging, the magnetic resonance angiogram (MRA) has become the new gold standard test for aortic dissection, with a sensitivity of 95% and a specificity of 92%.  Before widespread acceptance of any new test, the former test retains its status as the "gold standard".

Test calibration

Because tests can be incorrect (yielding a false-negative or a false-positive), results should be interpreted in the context of the history, physical findings, and other test results in the individual being tested. It is within this context that the sensitivity and specificity of the "gold standard" test is determined.

When the gold standard is not a perfect one, its sensitivity and specificity must be calibrated against more accurate tests or against the definition of the condition. This calibration is especially important when a perfect test is available only by autopsy.
It is important to emphasize that a test has to meet some interobserver agreement, to avoid some bias induced by the study itself.

Calibration errors can lead to misdiagnosis.

Ambiguity

Sometimes "gold standard test" refers to the best performing test available. In these cases, there is no other criterion against which it can be compared and it is equivalent to a definition. When referring to this meaning, gold standard tests are normally not performed at all. This is because the gold standard test may be difficult to perform or may be impossible to perform on a living person (i.e. the test is performed as part of an autopsy or may take too long for the results of the test to be available to be clinically useful).

Other times, "gold standard" does not refer to the best performing test available, but the best available under reasonable conditions. For example, in this sense, an MRI is the gold standard for brain tumour diagnosis, though it is not as good as a biopsy. In this case the sensitivity and specificity of the gold standard are not 100% and it is said to be an "imperfect gold standard" or "alloyed gold standard".

The term ground truth refers to the underlying absolute state of information; the gold standard strives to represent the ground truth as closely as possible. While the gold standard is a best effort to obtain the truth, ground truth is typically collected by direct observations.

See also
Evidence-based medicine
Ground truth
Statistical test

References

Epidemiology
Medical tests